Massachusetts House of Representatives' 27th Middlesex district in the United States is one of 160 legislative districts included in the lower house of the Massachusetts General Court. It covers part of the city of Somerville in Middlesex County. Democrat Erika Uyterhoeven is the current representative.

The current district geographic boundary overlaps with that of the Massachusetts Senate's 2nd Middlesex district.

Representatives
 Cyrus A. Davis, circa 1858 
 Noah Ball, circa 1859 
 Dennis J. O'Brien, circa 1888 
 Lewis Parkhurst, circa 1908
 Winfield F. Prime, 1913-1914
 Jacob Bitzer, 1915-1919
 Charles C. Warren, circa 1920 
 Bert Currier, circa 1923
 Owen McLellan, circa 1935
 Michael Francis Skerry, circa 1951 
 Paul Cavanaugh, circa 1967
 Sherman W. Saltmarsh, Jr., circa 1975 
 Charles Flaherty, circa 1983
 Patricia D. Jehlen
 Denise Provost, 2007-2021
 Erika Uyterhoeven, 2021-present

Former locale
The district previously covered:
 part of Lowell, circa 1872

See also
 List of Massachusetts House of Representatives elections
 List of Massachusetts General Courts
 List of former districts of the Massachusetts House of Representatives
 Other Middlesex County districts of the Massachusetts House of Representatives: 1st, 2nd, 3rd, 4th, 5th, 6th, 7th, 8th, 9th, 10th, 11th, 12th, 13th, 14th, 15th, 16th, 17th, 18th, 19th, 20th, 21st, 22nd, 23rd, 24th, 25th, 26th, 28th, 29th, 30th, 31st, 32nd, 33rd, 34th, 35th, 36th, 37th

Images

References

Further reading

External links
 Ballotpedia
  (State House district information based on U.S. Census Bureau's American Community Survey).

House
Government of Middlesex County, Massachusetts